Florian Anderle (born 26 June 1990) is an Austrian footballer who plays for SV Heldenberg.

Club career

Floridsdorfer AC
In June 2018, Anderle moved to Austrian 2. liga club Floridsdorfer AC, arriving alongside Burak Yilmaz. In January 2019, Anderle dissolved his contract with the club.

Coaching career
Alongside his playing career, Anderle also served as youth coach in SV W4IT Ziersdorf from 2012 to 2016. Anderle spent the next four years as a freelance coach at GoalGetterAkademie in Wien.

From July 2020 to February 2021, he worked as an athletic coach at the academy of St. Pölten. Ahead of the 2021/22 season, Anderle began playing for FC Wacker Innsbruck's reserve team. At the same time, he also became coach of the club's 3rd senior team ahead of the 2021/22 season.

On 3 June 2022, FC Wacker Innsbruck confirmed that Thomas Löffler, with Anderle as his assistant coach, would take charge of the clubs reserve team until the end of the season. In July 2022, Anderle joined SV Heldenberg, where he both functioned as a player and as a individual coach. On 29 September 2022, he was named new manager of Heldenberg. 

In January 2023, Anderle was hired as U18 assistant manager at LASK.

References

External links

Florian Anderle at ÖFB (player profile)
Florian Anderle at ÖFB (coach profile)

1990 births
Living people
SV Horn players
Floridsdorfer AC players
FC Wacker Innsbruck (2002) players
2. Liga (Austria) players
Austrian footballers
Association football defenders
Austrian football managers